The 2017–18 Shakhtar Donetsk season is the club's 27th season.

Squad
The squad is as of 2 March 2018.

Other players under the contract

U21 team squad

New contracts

Transfers

Transfer in

Transfer out

Loan in

Loan out

Loan return

2017–18 selection by nationality

Friendlies

Competitions

Overall
{| class="wikitable" style="text-align:center; width:730px;"
|-
! style="text-align:center; width:150px;" | Competition
! style="text-align:center; width:100px;" | Started round
! style="text-align:center; width:100px;" | Current  position
! style="text-align:center; width:100px;" | Final  position
! style="text-align:center; width:150px;" | First match
! style="text-align:center; width:150px;" | Last match
|-
| style="text-align:left;" | Premier League
| Matchday 1
| —
|  style="text-align:center; background:gold;"|Winners
| 18 July 2017
| 19 May 2018
|-
| style="text-align:left;" | Cup
| Round of 16
| —
| style="text-align:center; background:gold;"|Winners
| 25 October 2017
| 9 May 2018
|-
| style="text-align:left;" | Super Cup
| Final
| —
| style="text-align:center; background:gold;"|Winners
| 15 July 2017
| 15 July 2017
|-
| style="text-align:left;" | Champions League
| Group stage
| —
| Round of 16
| 13 September 2017
| 13 March 2018

Overview

Goalscorers

Clean sheets

Disciplinary record

Notes

References

External links 
Official website

Shakhtar Donetsk
FC Shakhtar Donetsk seasons
Ukrainian football championship-winning seasons
Shakhtar Donetsk